Xi Telescopii, Latinized from ξ Telescopii, is a solitary star in the southern constellation of Telescopium. It is visible to the naked eye, with an apparent visual magnitude of +4.95. Based upon an annual parallax shift of 3.02 mas as measured from Earth, it is located approximately 1,100 light-years from the Sun.

This is an evolved star with a stellar classification of K5 III or M1 IIab, indicating it is a giant or bright giant star. This is a variable star tentatively classified as a slow irregular-type variable with a brightness that varies between magnitude +4.89 and +4.94. Koen and Eyer examined the Hipparcos data for this star, and found that it varied periodically, with a period of 12.36 days, and an amplitude of 0.0083 magnitudes.

References

K-type giants
M-type bright giants
Suspected variables
Telescopii, Xi
Telescopium (constellation)
190421
099120
7673
Durchmusterung objects